Alexandroupoli Football Club is a Greek football club based in Alexandroupoli, Evros, Greece.

History 
The club was established in 2019, after the merger of Enosi Antheia/Aristino FC and AO Thrace FC.

References

Evros (regional unit)
Association football clubs established in 2019
2019 establishments in Greece
Gamma Ethniki clubs